Live at the Gods is a live album by Hardline which was released on DVD and CD in 2003. It was recorded at the Gods Festival in Bradford, England on 2 June 2002, where Hardline was the headliner for this festival. The concert was an all day festival which featured eight other bands, such as Jeff Scott Soto, who marked his first live performance as a solo artist, and Harem Scarem. Hardline was the last band to play at 2 a.m. and during the first couple of songs on the show, the band was suffering from technical and sound problems on stage. The microphones and equipment were worn out after being on all day. This also affected the back up singer's microphones the most, causing them to not hear their own voices over the loud music. Furthermore, Johnny Gioeli was recovering from a throat infection at the time, although his voice still sounded quite powerful on stage, While performing the ballad "Face the Night", an angry Johnny Gioeli storms off stage to talk to the Tech Staff to fix the microphones, but keeps his cool and comes back on stage to perform the rest of the show. Three back up singers were used (two female, one male) at the concert. The female backup singers, Gudi Laos and Katja Kutz also toured with Johnny's other band – Axel Rudi Pell – on their 2002 Shadow Zone tour. The line up for the band members in the show is the same as Hardline's second album, with the exception of bass player Christopher Maloney's replacement by producer Bob Burch.

The CD version contains 3 bonus tracks, originally written for the album II. However, the bonus tracks were released without Gioeli's approval or knowledge. The DVD features the entire concert with no bonus footage, however there is a slide show containing photos taken from the concert at the end after the credits, while the unreleased track "Hypnotized," which was originally written for what was going to be Hardline's second album with the original line-up, plays as background.

Gioeli also revealed in a 2002 interview regarding II that he had attempted to get the original Hardline line-up back together for both the new album and the Gods Festival. "Deen was contacted first and although he was interested in doing it he was petrified that Neal would be angry if he did it. I contacted Neal directly and he was all in favor of doing solos on the record based on him liking the songs. I said, 'Play on what you like and the fans will love it.' I had no way of knowing how to get in touch with Todd. I think he was back on the road with David Lee Roth. I just recently got word back from our keyboard player Michael that Todd would have been interested doing the record. It's a real kick in the ass but hey he couldn't have anyway being on the road. I almost had the whole band back. I tried for the Hardline fans."

Track listing
"Intro" – 0:16
"Hot Cherie" – 6:15
"Life's a Bitch" – 4:33
"Everything" – 4:14
"Face the Night" – 4:30
"Takin' Me Down" – 4:00
"Weight" – 3:27
"In the Hands of Time" – 8:04
"Only a Night" – 4:10
"I'll Be There" – 4:00
"Drum Solo" – 4:13
"Rhythm from a Red Car" – 5:24
"Keyboards Solo" – 3:00
"Dr Love" – 6:53

CD version bonus tracks
"Hypnotized" – 4:30
"Only a Night" (Acoustic) – 3:46
"Mercy" – 3:48

Personnel
Johnny Gioeli – vocals
Josh Ramos – lead guitar
Joey Gioeli – rhythm guitars
Michael T. Ross – keyboards
Bob Burch – bass guitar
Bobby Rock – drums

References

2003 live albums
2003 video albums
Hardline (band) albums
Frontiers Records live albums
Frontiers Records video albums
Frontiers Records albums

it:Hardline II
fi:II (Hardlinen albumi)